Farhan Ahmed Jovan (born 25 January 1982) is a Bangladeshi actor known for his TV work.

Biography
Jovan has a younger brother and sister. Their father, a businessman, has worked in the United States since 2014. As of 2015, Jovan was enrolled in the BBA program at United International University in Dhaka.

Jovan started his career in 2011 as a model in a television advertisement for Bangladeshi food brand Pran. Two years later he made his television show debut on Atiq Zaman's series University. His music video Ichchey Manush from the natok (TV drama) Shawon Gaanwala was the fifth most viewed Bangladeshi song on YouTube in 2016.

Farhan Ahmed Jovan was a breath of fresh air when he made his debut in 2013, as he went on to solidify his place in the industry with his hard work and talent.

Works
Farhan Ahmed Jovan is known for Ostitto (2016), Palai palai (2021) and Morichika (2021)

Television 

2013
 University

2015
 Nine and a Half
 Jhalamuri
 House No. 44
 Rabbu Bhai Bau
 Brothers
 Na-Manush

2016
 Nagardola
 Ekhon Onek Raat
 Masti Reloaded
 Deyaler Opare
 Ami Tumi
 Moments (short)
 It is my love story
 Jonakir Alo
 Tithir Atithi
 Chowdhury and Sons
 Tarun Turki
 Shunyata
 Back Bencher
 Noy Choy
 Brishtider Bari
 Ashomoyer Brittey
 Maya (short)

2017
 Valentine's Gift
 Baghbondi
 Obosheshe amra
 Brothers 2

2018
 Crossing
 Best Friend
 Kinchit Somossa
 Dekha
 A Love Story
 Ekdin Brishtite
 Je Golper Shesh Nei
 Bhalobasha Emono Hoy
 Vule vora golpo

2019
 Bhor Hote Ektu Baki
 Abegi Megher Vitor
 Tui Thekey Tumi
 Detective Love
 Brishchik-The Scorpion
 Somudramanob
 Bhalobashar Nilam
 Eshan
 Best Friend 2
 Ekti valo golper khoje
 Little Rome Cafe (short)
 Amra korbo joy

2020
 Abujh Mon
 Network pacchi na
 Prem ekattor

2021
 Dearing Caring
 Gohona
 Cholo Na Harai
 Best Friend 3
 Bikal Belar Chad
 Keo Karo Noy
 Baba Tomake Bhalobashi
 Maayer Daak
 Amar Birthday
 Morichika
 Shunte Ki Pau Tumi
 Palai Palai
 Brothers 3
 Jol Rong

2022
 Year Mate

References

External links 
 

Living people
1984 births
Bangladeshi male film actors
Bangladesh articles needing attention
People from Dinajpur District, Bangladesh
Year of birth uncertain